John Lloyd Espidol Cruz (born June 24, 1983) is a Filipino actor, model and occasional TV host. He was a member of ABS-CBN's Star Magic, where he is an alumnus of Batch 5. He starred in the teen drama Tabing Ilog, and is best known for his works in soap operas such as It Might Be You, Maging Sino Ka Man, I ♥ Betty La Fea, and Imortal. Throughout his career, Cruz has collaborated with numerous actresses including Kaye Abad, Bea Alonzo, Angel Locsin, Toni Gonzaga and Sarah Geronimo.

Cruz finished his education at Marikina Catholic School. He attended his secondary education until third year at ABS-CBN Distance Learning Center. He used to reside in Santolan, Pasig, and also owned a house in Valle Verde, an exclusive subdivision in Pasig. As of 2017, Cruz currently resides in Cebu City.

He is currently managed by Maja Salvador's Crown Artist Management.

On November 9, 2021 he signed a contract with GMA Network Inc as part of his TV Comeback. His first comeback appearance was on GMA's Wowowin and currently he leads the role of GMA's sitcom entitled "Happy To Get Her". The show is airing on GMA Network Sunday nights.

Background
Cruz was born John Lloyd Espidol Cruz, the youngest child of Luisito Llora and Aida Espidol Cruz. He was called by nicknames "Juward" and "Idan" among his family and some close friends. Cruz finished his grade school at Marikina Catholic School in 1996. He was later discovered by a talent scout in a mall while hanging out with friends to watch Magic Temple. Due to his father's failing marble business, Cruz decided to enter showbiz to help his family recover from financial problems. He first appeared in GMA Public Affairs' reenactment legal talk show Compañero y Compañera, followed by the crime and investigative series Calvento Files. This was followed by several guest appearances and shows. At age 14, Cruz became a member of ABS-CBN's Star Magic, where he became an alumnus of Batch 5. He was also a member of the then-teen trio called Koolits with Baron Geisler and Marc Solis.

Television career
Since he started his showbiz career in 1996, he was a contract talent for ABS-CBN.

In 1999, Cruz played the role of Rovic in the teen drama Tabing Ilog, alongside Kaye Abad, which lasted for almost four years. His breakthrough role came in 2002 by portraying the character of Yuri in Kay Tagal Kang Hinintay, where he is paired with Bea Alonzo. He was later cast in It Might Be You and Ikaw Ang Lahat Sa Akin.

In 2006, Cruz starred in the highly successful soap opera Maging Sino Ka Man along with Bea Alonzo, Anne Curtis and Sam Milby. The second season of the drama was aired in 2007. In 2009, he made another collaboration with Bea Alonzo and played the male protagonist Armando in I ♥ Betty La Fea, a Philippine adaptation of the Colombian telenovela Yo Soy Betty La Fea. In 2010, Cruz was paired with Angel Locsin in the critically acclaimed dark fantasy series Imortal, a sequel of the original series Lobo.

As a TV host, Cruz had recurring appearances in the longest-running Sunday noontime variety show, ASAP. He was also recruited as one of four members of the Kanto Boys alongside ASAP mainstays Vhong Navarro, Billy Crawford and Luis Manzano.

In 2014, Cruz played the role of Romeo in the Saturday sitcom series Home Sweetie Home with Toni Gonzaga, which lasted until he left the show in 2017. He went on indefinite leave from show business after a controversial relationship with model and actress Ellen Adarna, who was his fellow co-star in Home Sweetie Home. Since 2019, Cruz makes occasional cameos in commercial ads.

During the COVID-19 pandemic, Cruz was approached by Willie Revillame to make a television comeback by transferring to GMA Network. On May 16, 2021, he signed up with Crown Artist Management. On June 6, 2021, he made an appearance at GMA's broadcast of Shopee's "6.6. Mid-year Sale" TV event. He would officially sign a contract with the network on November 9, 2021.

Film career

John Lloyd Cruz starred with Sarah Geronimo in A Very Special Love produced by Star Cinema and Viva Films, which was released on July 30, 2008. The film grossed PHP 179,569,117 at the box office. In February 2009, Cruz's follow-up movie with Geronimo, You Changed My Life, a sequel to A Very Special Love also produced by Star Cinema and Viva Films, hit the box office. The film's total theatrical earnings reached PHP 240.44 million and was ranked as the highest grossing Filipino film of all time in that same year. In mid-2009, he shifted from his regular roles for a more controversial, challenging project with Vilma Santos, in which he portrayed Luis Manzano's lover in the movie In My Life. Cruz has been nailed as the "Box-Office King" for three-consecutive years: in 2007 for One More Chance, in 2008 with A Very Special Love, and in 2009 with You Changed My Life, which became the top-grossing film of his career during that time until approximately six years later.

Cruz's reunion movie with love team partner Bea Alonzo, Miss You Like Crazy, released in February 2010 as Star Cinema's post-office offering, was a box office hit earning more than PHP 140 million in its seven-week run and still the second top Filipino movie of 2010. He was later paired again with Toni Gonzaga in another box-office film titled My Amnesia Girl that earned 12.8 million on its first day (November 2010) and surpassing 100 million in its first-week run. It was directed by the box-office director Cathy Garcia Molina. It earned PHP 165 million in its one-month run and was the top-grossing film of 2010. Plans for making a movie with the Kanto Boys of ASAP was proposed for 2011 but was never pushed through. In 2012, Cruz and Alonzo starred in the film The Mistress to celebrate their 10th anniversary as a love team. The Mistress was critically acclaimed, leaving a total box-office gross of P260,000,000 and being the third highest grossing Filipino film of all time. He then reunites again with Geronimo for It Takes a Man and a Woman, a third and final sequel of the films A Very Special Love and You Changed My Life, which was released in 2013.

In 2015, Cruz starred and produced a thriller movie Honor Thy Father, which was first screened in the Contemporary World Cinema section of the 2015 Toronto International Film Festival. He plays the part of a man who, after a period of estrangement from his family, returns home to seek their help when his wife gets them into trouble with violent investors whose money her dad had lost in a ponzi scheme. Also in that same year, Cruz and Alonzo starred again together in the movie A Second Chance, the sequel of highly successful 2007 film One More Chance. The film was released on November 25, 2015 and earned PHP 550 million, becoming the highest grossing Filipino film of 2015 and the highest grossing Filipino film of all time.

Cruz has been also recognized as one of three honorees of the Star Asia award at the 15th New York Asian Film Festival (NYAFF). He is the first Filipino and Southeast Asian actor to receive the honor. He joins Hong Kong's Miriam Yeung and South Korea's Lee Byung-hun – all box office stars in their own countries – as that year's recipients of the award.

Activities
Cruz endorsed brands such as Bear Brand Milk, PSBank, Banana Peel, Tropicana Fruit Burst, 555, Sun Cellular, Magic Flakes, Biogesic, Adidas, Greenwich, 555 Corned Tuna, Swatch, Direct TV, Purefoods Tender Juicy, Smart, Choco Lava, Urban bags, Head & Shoulders, Lucky Me, Cherry Mobile, Joel Cruz Signatures perfume products John Lloyd Cruz Like Him and Likes Her and Aficionado Inspired EDT, LaBreza Tower, Skinwhite, Belo, Faces and Curves, Charms and Crystals, GAOC and Jollibee.

He is considered one of the most-acclaimed actors in the country, and was recently inducted to the Philippine Walk of Fame by German "Kuya Germs" Moreno in Eastwood City, Libis, Quezon City. His film and television projects are usually big hits with audiences nationwide.

Filmography

Film

Television

Awards and nominations

References

External links

 
 GMA Network profile

1983 births
Living people
People from Pasay
Filipino people of Spanish descent
Male actors from Metro Manila
Filipino television personalities
Filipino male television actors
Filipino male film actors
Filipino male comedians
ABS-CBN personalities
Star Magic
GMA Network personalities